Florence Gillam Birdwell (December 31, 1924 – February 15, 2021), sometimes referred to as Flo Birdwell, was an American educator, musician, and singer. She taught musical theater and opera singing for more than six decades.  She served as a professor of voice at the Bass School of Music at Oklahoma City University from 1946 to 2013, and afterwards periodically teaching masterclasses as a professor emeritus.

Life and career

Born Florence Gillam Hobin in Douglas, Arizona, Birdwell was the daughter of Warner and Grace (Gillam) Hobin. She was raised in Santa Fe, New Mexico and Lawton, Oklahoma. She studied voice under Inez Silberg at Oklahoma City University (OCU), where she earned undergraduate (1945) and graduate degrees. After additional instruction, Birdwell returned to OCU where she joined the voice faculty.

Birdwell received the Governor's Arts Award in 1985 from Oklahoma governor George Nigh. In 1990, OCU established the Florence Birdwell Vocal Scholarship Fund in her honor.  In 2004, she was honored as a Member Laureate of Sigma Alpha Iota, an international music fraternity for women. In March 2007, "Starry Night," a musical tribute to her lengthy teaching career, was held as a fundraising event to fund an endowed chair in Birdwell's name at the university.

Birdwell's students have included Kristin Chenoweth, Kelli O'Hara, Lara Teeter and Miss America 1981 Susan Powell.

References

External links
Official biography at Oklahoma City University website
Video of interview with Birdwell

1924 births
2021 deaths
Voice teachers
Musicians from Santa Fe, New Mexico
Oklahoma City University alumni
Oklahoma City University faculty
Sigma Alpha Iota
20th-century American educators
20th-century American women educators
21st-century American educators
21st-century American women educators
Place of birth missing
Place of death missing
American women academics